Harvey Robert Levin (born September 2, 1950) is an American television producer, legal analyst, celebrity reporter, and former lawyer. He is the founder of celebrity news website TMZ, and the former host of OBJECTified, which aired on the Fox News Channel.

Early life and education 
Levin was born September 2, 1950, in Los Angeles County, California to a Jewish family.  He attended high school at Grover Cleveland High School in Reseda, Los Angeles and graduated in 1968 with honors.  Levin attended the University of California, Santa Barbara, where he graduated with a B.A. in political science in 1972. He later attended the University of Chicago Law School and graduated with a J.D. in 1975.

Career

Early law career and academia 
Levin was an active attorney in the state of California for two decades, from December 18, 1975, until January 1, 1996. In the mid-1970s, he taught law at the University of Miami School of Law under Soia Mentschikoff. He then practiced law briefly in Los Angeles before taking a position at Whittier College School of Law.

In 1978, Levin came to public attention following a series of high-profile debates with Howard Jarvis, the co-author of Proposition 13, California's controversial property tax-reduction ballot measure, which Levin opposed. 

With his newfound fame, Levin began to contribute legal advice on a radio show, where he was nicknamed "Doctor Law", as well as to write columns for the Los Angeles Times. His columnist career with the Times spanned seven years.

Transition to entertainment 
Levin covered legal issues for KNBC-TV in 1982. He subsequently joined KCBS-TV and spent a decade doing investigative reporting and legal analysis, most notably covering the O. J. Simpson murder case.

In 1997 he was named co-executive producer and on-air legal anchor for The People's Court. He created Celebrity Justice, which ran from 2002 to 2005.

Levin produced Beyond Twisted, which aired in 2009 for one season before being cancelled. He created Famous in 12 (2014), an experiment in exploiting a family for quick fame, but the show was cancelled after less than one season, with only five of the scheduled twelve episodes having aired.

Since 2016, Levin has hosted the weekly prerecorded show OBJECTified on the Fox News Channel.

TMZ 

In 2005, AOL and Telepictures Productions launched TMZ with Levin as the founder and managing editor.  The website quickly rose to prominence when it broke the story of Mel Gibson's DUI arrest and subsequent antisemitic rant.  It continued to break a number of high-profile stories including the abuse of Rihanna by Chris Brown, the deaths of Heath Ledger, Brittany Murphy, Kobe Bryant, and Michael Jackson.  The Los Angeles Times named TMZ's coverage of the Jackson death as the biggest story the website had covered to date.

Other ventures 
Harvey Levin Productions has produced Levin's media projects since he joined The People's Court in 1983 as the show's legal consultant. In 1985, Levin wrote The People's Court: How to Tell It to the Judge, reviewing and providing commentary on several cases from the show. The Library Journal "recommended [the book] for public libraries."

Personal life 
Levin appeared as an event speaker for the National Lesbian and Gay Journalists Association in April 2010 in which he publicly confirmed his self-identification as gay.  He discussed his fear of losing his career if someone were to find out, which led to Levin compartmentalizing his personal and professional lives.

Levin's longtime partner is Andy Mauer, a chiropractor in southern California.  The two own multiple properties together, sharing joint-deed listings since the late 1990s and early 2000s.

Levin has been named to Out magazine's "Power 50" list as one of the most influential voices in LGBT America since 2012 when he was named #15.  He has since been named #25 in 2013, #34 in 2014, #48 in 2015, and #40 in 2016.

Politics
Levin became increasingly supportive of Donald Trump in the run-up to the 2016 United States presidential election. Following the election, he met with Trump in the Oval Office on March 7, 2017, and chatted for an hour.

Filmography
 Volcano (1997) – Reporter
 Celebrity Justice – Host
 TMZ - Himself - (2005 to Present)
 Family Guy - Himself - S-8 Ep-14 - "Peter-assment" (2010)

Books
 The People's Court: How to Tell it to the Judge (1985)

Awards and honors 
For his broadcast work, Levin has been nominated for nine Emmys.

References

Further reading 
 
———————
Notes

External links 

 
 Variety profile

1950 births
Living people
American infotainers
American businesspeople in the online media industry
Television producers from California
Fox News people
Lawyers from Los Angeles
University of California, Santa Barbara alumni
University of Chicago Law School alumni
Whittier College faculty
Jewish American attorneys
LGBT Jews
LGBT producers
LGBT lawyers
American LGBT broadcasters
American gay writers
American gay actors
LGBT people from California
California lawyers
21st-century American Jews